The Division of Corio is an Australian electoral division in the state of Victoria. The division was proclaimed in 1900, and was one of the original 65 divisions to be contested at the first federal election. Named for Corio Bay, it has always been based on the city of Geelong, although in the past it stretched as far east as the outer western suburbs of Melbourne.

The current Member for Corio, since the 2007 federal election, is Richard Marles, the current Deputy Prime Minister of Australia.

History

For most of the first seven decades after Federation, it was a marginal seat that frequently changed hands between the Australian Labor Party and the conservative parties. However, Labor has held it without interruption since a 1967 by-election, and since the 1980s it has been one of Labor's safest non-metropolitan seats. Presently, the Liberals need a 10 percent swing to win it, up from 7.7 percent at the time the writs were dropped for the 2016 election.

Its most prominent members have been Richard Casey, a leading Cabinet member in the 1930s and later Governor-General; John Dedman, a Chifley government minister; Hubert Opperman, a former cycling champion and a minister in the Menzies government; and Gordon Scholes, who was Speaker during the Whitlam government and a minister in the Hawke government.

Boundaries
Since 1984, federal electoral division boundaries in Australia have been determined at redistributions by a redistribution committee appointed by the Australian Electoral Commission. Redistributions occur for the boundaries of divisions in a particular state, and they occur every seven years, or sooner if a state's representation entitlement changes or when divisions of a state are malapportioned.

Members

Election results

References

External links
 Division of Corio - Australian Electoral Commission

Electoral divisions of Australia
Constituencies established in 1901
1901 establishments in Australia
Geelong
Barwon South West (region)